The Mucutá River is a river in the state of Pará, Brazil. It is a tributary of the Piriá River.

The river is on the island of Marajó to the northwest of Belém in the delta region where the Amazon and Tocantins rivers empty into the Atlantic Ocean.
It runs through part of the  Terra Grande-Pracuúba Extractive Reserve, a sustainable use conservation unit created in 2006.

See also
List of rivers of Pará

References

Rivers of Pará